Purpurellus is a genus of sea snails, marine gastropod mollusks in the family Muricidae, the murex snails or rock snails.

Species
Species within the genus Purpurellus include:

 Purpurellus gambiensis (Reeve, 1845)
 Purpurellus macleani (Emerson & D'Attilio, 1969)
 Purpurellus pinniger (Broderip, 1833)

References

Muricinae
Gastropod genera
Gastropods described in 1880
Taxa named by Félix Pierre Jousseaume